Lampedusa is the largest island of the Italian Pelagie Islands in the Mediterranean Sea.

The comune of Lampedusa e Linosa is part of the Sicilian province of Agrigento which also includes the smaller islands of Linosa and Lampione. It is the southernmost part of Italy and Italy's southernmost island.

Its main industries are fishing, agriculture, and tourism. A ferry service links the island with Porto Empedocle, near Agrigento, Sicily. There are also year-round flights from Lampedusa Airport to Palermo and Catania on the Sicilian mainland. In the summer, there are additional services to Rome and Milan, besides many other seasonal links with the Italian mainland.

In 2013, Spiaggia dei Conigli ("Rabbit Beach"), located in the southern part of the island, was voted the world's best beach by travel site TripAdvisor.

Since the early 2000s, the island has become a primary European entry point for migrants, mainly coming from Libya.

In 2021, the island received the Jan Karski Eagle Award, as the first and only time that the award was given out three times in a year.

Etymology
The name Lampedusa derives from the ancient Greek name of the island, Λοπαδούσσα or Λαπαδούσσα (Lopadoússa/Lapadoússa). 
It has been suggested that the name derives from the word λέπας (lépas), which means 'rock', due to the rocky landscape of the island; another story is that this word was also used by the Greeks for a kind of oyster and the island called that, due to the abundance of this kind of oyster. Other scholars believe that the name derives from λαμπάς (lampás), which means 'torch', because of the lights which were placed on the island for sailors.

History

Historically, Lampedusa was a landing place and a maritime base for the ancient Phoenicians, Greeks, Romans and Berbers. The Romans established a plant for the production of the prized fish sauce known as garum. In 812 (or 813), directed by the Aghlabids, the island was sacked by Saracens during the Arab–Byzantine wars.

By the end of the medieval period, the island became a dependency of the Kingdom of Sicily. In 1553, Barbary pirates from North Africa under the command of the Ottoman Empire raided Lampedusa, and carried off 1,000 captives into slavery. As a result of pirate attacks, the island became uninhabited. In 1565, Don García de Toledo made a brief stop at Lampedusa while leading a relief force to break the Great Siege of Malta. In subsequent centuries, the Hospitaller fleet which was based in Malta sometimes used Lampedusa's harbour as a shelter from bad weather or from corsairs.

In 1667, the island was given to Ferdinand Tomasi of Palermo, who acquired the title of Prince of Lampedusa from King Charles II of Spain. Tomasi was the ancestor of the writer Giuseppe Tomasi di Lampedusa. A century after acquiring the island, the Tomasi family began a program of resettlement.

In the late 18th century, the Order of St. John maintained a small establishment on Lampedusa, which included a chapel dedicated to the Virgin Mary. This was manned by a priest and six Maltese men, who often traded with pirates. A structure known as marabuto, probably a mausoleum commemorating a member of the Marabouts, also existed on the island at this time, and it was visited by many Muslim devotees.

19th century

On 25 June 1800, Prince Giulio Maria Tomasi leased Lampedusa in perpetual emphyteusis to Salvatore Gatt, a Maltese merchant, on the condition that the latter would build two coastal watchtowers at Cala della Galere and Cala della Madonna. Gatt settled the island with some Maltese workers, and he imported livestock and began cultivating the land. The old castle was reconstructed, and a windmill was also built. Gatt hoisted the British flag for protection. On 27 June 1804, the prince conceded the island to Giuseppe Bugeja, another Maltese, although Gatt remained in control of the island.

At the time, the British were considering taking over Lampedusa, possibly as an alternative to Malta, which had just become a British protectorate. In 1803, the Royal Navy dropped the idea since the island's small harbour was not comparable to Malta's larger and well-fortified Grand Harbour. However, reports stated that the island could be useful in supplying Malta, especially with the threat of Sicily falling to the French.

In 1810, Gatt leased the island to Alexander Fernandez of the Army Commissariat in the Mediterranean, who established a farm with cattle and sheep, and employed 28 workers to turn the island's surface into pasturage. A small detachment of 26 men of the 14th Regiment were sent to the island in 1811 to support Fernandez, who was planning to built a fort on the island. By 1813, the island had a population of almost 200 Maltese workers.

A royal commission stated in an 1812 report that there would be considerable difficulties in turning the island (together with Linosa and Pantelleria) into a supply base for Malta. The commission found Fernandez's situation to be very strange, and the treasury demanded an explanation of his conduct. In November 1813, the sloop HMS Partridge was infected with yellow fever, and was sent to Lampedusa until convalescence. This caused most of the population to flee back to Malta, leaving only 50 to 60 people on the island. The Governor of Malta, Sir Thomas Maitland, visited Lampedusa and found that Fernandez was running a business venture, so on 15 September 1814 he announced the withdrawal of British troops stationed on the island. The same notice also stated that "it is not the intention of [the British] Government to have any further concern or connection with [Lampedusa]". At this point, Greek privateers deposited provisions and took refuge at Lampedusa while being pursued by Tunisian vessels.

Fernandez had left for Gibraltar in 1813, but he continued to make claims on his title in Lampedusa. The British Government refused to compensate him in 1818, and Sicilian courts deprived him of his title soon afterwards. The Gatt family retook possession of the island, but what happened in subsequent years is unclear. Salvatore Gatt is believed to have died or disappeared sometime between 1813 and 1821, and the island was taken over by Fortunato Frendo, who had murdered Giacoma Gatt, Salvatore's wife. An official expedition was sent to the island from Naples in 1828, and the island was found to be inhabited by members of the Frendo, Gatt, and Molinos families along with a few workers.

A Neapolitan warship visited the island in 1841 as a show of force, but nothing changed until 11 September 1843, when two warships arrived and landed 400 soldiers on the island. They substituted the British flags on the island with Neapolitan flags. A royal decree was read out proclaiming the island as part of the Kingdom of the Two Sicilies. A few of the Maltese settlers remained on the island, while others returned to Malta or went to Tunisia.

In the 1840s, the Tomasi family formally sold the island to the Kingdom of Naples. In 1861, the island became part of the Kingdom of Italy, but the new Italian government limited its activities there to building a penal colony.

20th century
During the Second World War, the island was Axis territory, held by a small Italian garrison.  Despite its proximity to Allied-held Malta and North Africa, the island did not see any military engagements until June 1943 when, as a precursor to the Allied invasion of Sicily, the island was secured without resistance in Operation Corkscrew by the Royal Navy destroyer HMS Lookout and ninety-five men of the 2nd Battalion the Coldstream Guards. White flags had been sighted in the port, and when Lieutenant Corbett of Lookout approached the port in a motor launch, he was told that the island's garrison wished to surrender. Mussolini had given the garrison his permission to surrender because it lacked any water. The Governor's formal surrender was accepted in the island's underground command-post by a combined Army/Navy delegation sometime before 9:00 pm on 12 June 1943. During this process, the governor handed his sword to the Coldstream company commander, Major Bill Harris. A second unofficial claim has also been made regarding the capitulation of the island, when earlier that same day elements of the garrison had also attempted to surrender in unusual circumstances when Sergeant Sydney Cohen, the pilot of a Royal Air Force Fairey Swordfish aircraft landed having run low on fuel and suffering problems with his compass. Cohen's exploits were commemorated in a Yiddish play The King of Lampedusa that ran for six months.

The first telephone connection with Sicily was installed only in the 1960s. In the same decade an electric power station was built.

In 1972, part of the western side of the island became a United States Coast Guard LORAN-C transmitter station. In 1979, Lt. Kay Hartzell took command of the Coast Guard base, becoming "the first female commanding officer of an isolated duty station".

The 1980s, and especially 1985–1986, saw an increase in tensions and the area around the island was the scene of multiple attacks. On April 15, 1986, Libya fired two Scuds at the Lampedusa navigation station on the island, in retaliation for the American bombing of Tripoli and Benghazi, and the alleged death of Colonel Gaddafi's adopted daughter. However, the missiles passed over the island, landed in the sea, and caused no damage.

The NATO base was decommissioned in 1994 and transferred to Italian military control.

North African immigration

Since the early 2000s, Lampedusa, the European territory closest to Libya, has become a prime transit point for migrants from Africa, the Middle East and Asia wanting to enter Europe. In 2004 the Libyan and Italian governments reached a secret agreement that obliged Libya to accept African immigrants deported from Italian territories. This resulted in the mass repatriation of many people from Lampedusa to Libya between 2004 and 2005, a move criticised by the European Parliament.

By 2006, many African immigrants were paying people smugglers in Libya to help get them to Lampedusa by boat. On arrival, most were then transferred by the Italian government to reception centres in mainland Italy. Many were then released because their deportation orders were not enforced.

In 2009, the overcrowded conditions at the island's temporary immigrant reception centre came under criticism by the United Nations High Commissioner for Refugees (UNHCR). The unit, which was originally built for a maximum capacity of 850 people, was reported to be housing nearly 2,000 boat people. A significant number of people were sleeping outdoors under plastic sheeting. A fire that started during an inmate riot destroyed a large portion of the holding facility on 19 February 2009.

In 2011, many more immigrants moved to Lampedusa during the rebellions in Tunisia and Libya. By May 2011, more than 35,000 immigrants had arrived on the island from Tunisia and Libya. By the end of August, 48,000 had arrived. Most were young males in their 20s and 30s. The situation has caused division within the EU, the French government regarding most of the arrivals as economic migrants rather than refugees in fear of persecution. Italy has repeatedly requested aid from the EU in managing refugees, but has been turned down.

In July 2013, Pope Francis visited the island on his first official visit outside of Rome. He prayed for migrants, living and dead, and denounced their traffickers. In October 2013, the 2013 Lampedusa disaster occurred; a boat carrying over 500 migrants, mostly from Eritrea and Somalia, sank off the coast of Lampedusa with the deaths of at least 300 people.

From January to April 2015, about 1600 migrants died on the route from Libya to Lampedusa, making it the deadliest migrant route in the world.

The 2017 Oscar-nominated Italian documentary film Fire at Sea documented a part of this migrant crisis and was filmed entirely on the island in 2014 and 2015. The film also won the Golden Bear at the 66th Berlin Film Festival.

Geography

Lampedusa is both the southernmost point and the southernmost island of Italy. Lampedusa is a semi-arid island, dominated by a garrigue landscape, with maquis shrubland in the west. It has no sources of water other than irregular rainfall. Overall the island has two slopes, from west to east, and from north to south of the island. The south-western side is dominated by deep gorges, while the southeastern part is dominated by shallow valleys and sandy beaches. The entire northern coast is dominated by cliffs: gently sloping cliffs on the east coast, and vertical sheer cliffs on the west coast.

Geology
Lampedusa geologically is part of the "Pelagian Province" (USGS definition), a structural member of the African continent, lying on a structural high called the Lampedusa Plateau. Lampedusa essentially is a tilted block of limestone, the highest point being on the NW coast and the lowest on the SE coast, the island being soft limestone, of a white to creamy-yellow. This area lies on a seismically active part of central Mediterranean, the Sicily Channel Rift Zone. From a structural point of view, Lampedusa belongs to the Pelagian Block, a foreland at the northern edge of the African plate, and is inside the Sicily Channel.

Climate
Lampedusa has a subtropical semi-arid climate (Köppen: BSh) characterized by very warm, almost rainless and humid summers, very mild and frost-free winters, a powerful seasonal lag and a small diurnal temperature range. The constant sea breezes, moderate the daytime summer temperatures. Lampedusa (along with coastal Pantelleria and Malta) is one of the very few areas along the Mediterranean Sea coast, which have never recorded frost.

Wildlife

The fauna and flora of Lampedusa are similar to those of North Africa, with a few pelagic endemic species. The Isola dei Conigli (literally "Rabbit Island"), close to the south coast of Lampedusa, is one of the last remaining egg-laying sites in Italy for the loggerhead sea turtle, which is endangered throughout the Mediterranean. The beach and the neighbouring island are part of a nature reserve: here the singer-songwriter Domenico Modugno spent his vacations, and died in 1994. Next to Parise Cape is a small beach accessible only by sea, through a low grotto. Other species living along the island's coast include mantas and smaller cetaceans such as dolphins and Risso's dolphins. Waters nearby Lampedusa are the only area in the Mediterranean with sightings of pregnant great white sharks and newly born individuals. Recent studies revealed that the waters of Lampedusa are a wintering feeding ground for the Mediterranean group of fin whales. Humpback whale, a species used to be considered as a vagrant species in to the Mediterranean basin, has been seen around the island in recent years.

Along with Linosa, Lampedusa once was a stronghold for endangered Mediterranean monk seals until the 1950s, and they are likely to be currently extirpated from the island. However, monk seals were sighted along Lampedusa in 2020.

In popular culture 
 Lampedusa was the filming location for the music video of Mango's single "Mediterraneo", from the album Come l'acqua (1992).
 The movie Respiro (2002), written and directed by Emanuele Crialese and starring Valeria Golino, was filmed entirely on Lampedusa.
 The book The Pharaoh's Secret (2015) by adventure fiction author Clive Cussler features Lampedusa as the scene of a mysterious deathly mist, which puts the island's entire population into a deathlike coma.
Think of Lampedusa is collection of poems by Ivorian Josué Guébo, inspired by the 2013 shipwreck and winning the Tchicaya U Tam'si Prize.
 The 2015 Austrian documentary Lampedusa im Winter, directed by Jakob Brossmann was filmed on the island.
 The 2016 book Tears of Salt: A Doctor's Story by Pietro Bartolo and Lidia Tilitta recounts life on the island and the migrant crisis from the perspective of a local doctor.
 The 2017 Oscar-nominated Italian documentary, Fire at Sea, was filmed entirely on the island between 2014 and 2015.
 Lampedusa is the title of the 2019 novelised biography of Giuseppe Tomasi di Lampedusa by Canadian novelist Steven Price.

See also
 List of islands of Italy
 Linosa
 Pantelleria
 Pelagie Islands
 LORAN-C transmitter Lampedusa
 Lampedusa Airport
 Quadro Group

References

External links

 
 "Why tourists are shunning a beautiful Italian island" – BBC News, 13 February 2015
 Lampedusa: Italy's gateway to Europe struggles with migrant influx – BBC News, 13 May 2021

Lampedusa e Linosa
Pelagie Islands
Coastal towns in Sicily
Frazioni of the Province of Agrigento
Islands of Africa
Phoenician colonies in Sicily
Mediterranean port cities and towns in Italy